Wollaston is a relatively small lunar impact crater located in the Oceanus Procellarum. To the northwest is the similar Nielsen. To the southeast is the somewhat larger Krieger. There are several small rilles to the southwest of Wollaston, forming part of the Rimae Prinz.

This is a circular, cup-shaped crater with a higher albedo than the surrounding mare. It has a raised rim that is free from impact erosion, and is surrounded by a small radial skirt of ejecta. The crater has not been significantly eroded by subsequent impacts.

Satellite craters
By convention these features are identified on lunar maps by placing the letter on the side of the crater midpoint that is closest to Wollaston.

The following craters have been renamed by the IAU.
 Wollaston C — See Nielsen.

References

External links
 LTO-39A1 Krieger — L&PI topographic map of crater and surroundings.

Impact craters on the Moon